H120 may refer to:

 Iriver H100 series
 Airbus Helicopters H120 Colibri
 H.120